is a Japanese multimedia franchise created by Kazutaka Kodaka. It consists of a video game developed by Too Kyo Games and published by Akatsuki and an anime television series by Liden Films, which aired from January to March 2022. A webtoon and stage was also announced.

Plot
Tribe Nine takes place in a dystopian future ("The Year 20XX") where disaffected youths form their own Tribes that soon turn violent and run rampant across the city of Neo-Tokyo. To contain the violence, the government of Neo-Tokyo implements the "XB Law", stating that all future conflicts between Tribes will be settled through games of "Extreme Baseball", overseen by robotic umpires. The games are similar to baseball except there are fewer restrictions on equipment, the "field" can be as big as an entire ward, and the only ways to get an Out require striking out the batter or tagging out a baserunner while holding the ball. Games can also end if the opposing team is rendered unable to continue playing the game.

Characters

Minato Tribe
The protagonists' faction, based out of the special ward of Minato. Their base is a diner that rarely gets customers. Their leader, Shun Kamiya, is considered one of the best XB players in all of Neo-Tokyo.

Chiyoda Tribe
The main antagonistic faction of Tribe Nine. Based out of the special ward of Chiyoda, home to the Imperial Palace and Diet Building, the Chiyoda Tribe considers themselves the seat of power over Neo-Tokyo as well, ruling from a floating palace. Though the only named XB player in Chiyoda is Ōjirō Ōtori, he is capable of defeating entire Tribes single-handedly.

Adachi Tribe
A wild, stubborn biker gang of a Tribe based out of the special ward of Adachi who use an old enclosed shopping arcade as their home field. Led by the gutsy Hyakutarō Senju, who literally sets his bat and ball on fire and tries to win through sheer power and determination.

Taito Tribe
A relatively laid-back Tribe based out of the Taitō ward. Its members prefer art and romance to fighting other Tribes, but have their own tactics to use against opponents who underestimate them. Taito's leaders operate out of a large pagoda.

Ota Tribe
A poor Tribe based out of Ōta that cares less about XB and more about causing chaos and destruction wherever they go. What they lack in skill, they make up in dirty tactics. Their leader, Fucho Sonoda, is constantly under assault by other tribe members that threaten to take his head, and he violently crushes them to maintain his position.

Shinagawa Tribe
Based out of the Shinagawa special ward, this Tribe prides itself on developing XB equipment to surpass the limits of what players can physically do on their own.

Setagaya Tribe
Based out of the Setagaya special ward, this Tribe is led by Eiji Todoroki, who thinks that he can buy anything with enough money, from bikini-clad women to victories in XB.

Various streamers have made cameo appearances in the series' English dub, including CDawgVA, Cr1TiKaL, Disguised Toast, Sykkuno, Technoblade, Valkyrae, and Yong Yea.

Media

Video game
The video game was first announced in February 2020, with Too Kyo Games developing and Akatsuki publishing. Two days later, the first trailer was released. In September 2021, it was revealed the game would be a 3D action role-playing game for smartphones.

Anime
In September 2021, an anime television series for the franchise was announced. It is produced by Liden Films and directed by Yū Aoki, with Michiko Yokote writing the script, Rui Komatsuzaki and Simadoriru designing the characters and Yosuke Yabumoto adapting the designs for animation, and Masafumi Takada composing the music. It aired from January 10 to March 28, 2022, on Tokyo MX and other networks. Miyavi performed the series' opening theme, titled "Strike It Out", while Void_Chords feat. LIO performed the ending theme, "Infocus". Funimation co-produced the series and will stream it on their services outside of Asia. Medialink licensed the series in Southeast Asia, South Asia, and Oceania minus Australia and New Zealand.

Episode list

Webtoon
A webtoon adaptation of the franchise was announced in September 2021.

Reception
The anime series' first episode garnered positive reviews from Anime News Network's staff during the Winter 2022 season previews. James Beckett wrote that "Tribe Nine is stupid, fun, colorful, and it made me smile a whole lot. This officially makes it a Good Anime That You Should Watch. No further questions at this time." Nicholas Dupree called it "a light and breezy premiere" that told its solid and quirky baseball story with striking character designs and "high-octane spectacle" but felt it was held back by its "clearly modest production". Richard Eisenbeis was also critical of the animation not showcasing the baseball scenes and character designs to its fullest, but concluded that: "[T]his first episode is 100% style over substance and it's a blast to watch. Now, will said style alone be able to carry the show as it goes on? Probably not. But I'll certainly be watching to find out." Conversely, Rebecca Silverman criticized the over-the-top premise for lacking a "touch of logic" to make it grounded and the constant bullying of Haru to get involved in the game.

Fellow ANN editor Monique Thomas chose Tribe Nine as her pick for the Worst Anime of Winter 2022, feeling disappointed by the "extremely limited" production making the art style and baseball scenes "stiff and boring", and the overall cast and XB world coming across as "barebones", concluding that: "It's not the complete worst, if anything I'd overall describe it as "mid," but compared to everything else I was watching, Tribe Nine struck out." Kim Morrissy chose the series as her pick for the Worst Anime of 2022, calling it a "more subdued affair" compared to Akudama Drive that squanders its opening episodes to become "an extremely average sports anime", concluding that "Tribe Nine was far from the year's worst anime, but it was unbearably mid."

Notes

References

External links
  
 

2022 anime television series debuts
Baseball in anime and manga
Baseball video games
Crunchyroll anime
Funimation
Liden Films
Mass media franchises
Mass media franchises introduced in 2022
Medialink
Too Kyo Games games
Tokyo MX original programming
Upcoming video games
Video games developed in Japan
Video games scored by Masafumi Takada